
Year 520 (DXX) was a leap year starting on Wednesday (link will display the full calendar) of the Julian calendar. In the Roman Empire, it was known as the Year of the Consulship of Rusticus and Vitalianus (or, less frequently, year 1273 Ab urbe condita). The denomination 520 for this year has been used since the early medieval period, when the Anno Domini calendar era became the prevalent method in Europe for naming years.

Events 
 By place 

 Byzantine Empire 
 Priscian, Latin grammarian, writes the Institutiones Grammaticae ("Grammatical Foundations"). In Constantinople, he codifies this manuscript in 18 volumes, that will be widely used through the Middle Ages. It provides the raw material for the field of speculative grammar. 
 July – Byzantine general Vitalian becomes consul, and is shortly later murdered, probably on the orders of Justinian, the nephew and heir-apparent of Emperor Justin I. 

 Britannia 
 King Pabo Post Prydain of the Pennines (Northern England) abdicates his throne, and divides the kingdom between his two sons. He retires, as a hermit, to Anglesey. 
 The Kingdom of East Anglia is formed, by the merging of the English counties of Norfolk and Suffolk, and perhaps the eastern part of The Fens  (approximate date). 
 King Budic II returns to Cornouaille (Brittany), to claim the Breton throne (approximate date).

 Europe 
 Ostrogothic ruler Theodoric the Great builds the Mausoleum of Theodoric, as his future tomb in Ravenna (Italy).

 Asia 
 Bodhidharma, Buddhist monk, arrives in Luoyang. He spreads Buddhism and travels to the northern Chinese kingdom of Wei, to the Shaolin Monastery.

 By topic 
 Religion 
 February 25 – Epiphanius is elected patriarch of Constantinople by Byzantine Emperor Justin I.
 The construction of the Basilica of San Vitale in Ravenna, is started (approximate date).

Births 
 Hou Andu, general of the Chen Dynasty (d. 563)
 Justin II, emperor of the Byzantine Empire (d. 578)
 Malo, Welsh bishop (approximate date)
 Martin of Braga, missionary and archbishop (d. 580)
 Pope Pelagius II of Rome (d. 589)
 Radegund, Frankish princess (approx.)
 Zuhayr bin Abi Sulma, Arabian poet (approx.)

Deaths 
 January 19 – John of Cappadocia, patriarch of Constantinople
 July – Vitalian, Byzantine general, consul
 Abbán, Irish cult leader and saint (approx.)
 Ardgal mac Conaill, king of Uisneach (Ireland)
 Isidore of Alexandria, Neoplatonist philosopher (approximate date)
 Maximinus, Frankish abbot and saint (approximate date) 
 Zu Gengzhi, Chinese mathematician (approx.)

References